Kotuń  is a village in Siedlce County, Masovian Voivodeship, in east-central Poland. It is the seat of the gmina (administrative district) called Gmina Kotuń. The village has a population of 2220.

References

Villages in Siedlce County
Lublin Governorate
Lublin Voivodeship (1919–1939)